Blackacre, Whiteacre, Greenacre, Brownacre, and variations are the placeholder names used for fictitious estates in land.

The names are used by professors of law in common law jurisdictions, particularly in the area of real property and occasionally in contracts, to discuss the rights of various parties to a piece of land. A typical law school or bar exam question on real property might say:

Where more than one estate is needed to demonstrate a pointperhaps relating to a dispute over boundaries, easements or riparian rightsa second estate will usually be called Whiteacre, a third, Greenacre, and a fourth, Brownacre.

Origin
Jesse Dukeminier, author of one of the leading series of textbooks on property, traces the use of Blackacre and Whiteacre for this purpose to a 1628 treatise by Sir Edward Coke. Dukeminier suggests that the term might originate with references to colors associated with certain crops ("peas and beans are black, corn and potatoes are white, hay is green"), or with the means by which rents were to be paid, with black rents payable in produce and white rents in silver. A 1790 treatise by Francis Buller similarly uses these placeholder names, stating: "If A. have Black Acre and C. have White Acre, and A. has a way over White Acre to Black Acre, and then purchases White Acre, the way will be extinct; and if A. afterwards enfeoff C. of White Acre without excepting the road, it is gone".

In various law journals and treatises in Louisiana, which uses a unique form of the civil law influenced by but not identical to the Napoleonic Code, authors have used the term "arpent noir" as a placeholder name for the purpose of discussing rights concerning immovables.

One of the more basic theories is that Blackacre and Whiteacre are related to what professors could draw on dark chalkboards in early law-school settings.  A simple outline of the property on the "blackboard" being "blackacre" and a chalk-colored-in property being "whiteacre".

In popular culture

Because of its association with legal education, a number of legal publications and events utilize the name. For example, Blackacre was adopted as the name of the literary journal at the University of Texas School of Law. Blackacre is also the name of a journal at the University of Sydney Law School, published annually by the Sydney University Law Society, the name of the open-air courtyard and weekly student social at Vanderbilt Law School, and the name of a William Mitchell College of Law formal.

The Blackacre Nature Preserve and Historic Homestead in Kentucky was so named by the donor of the land, Macauley Smith, who had been a judge on the Kentucky Court of Appeals. In July 2010, a legal humor website wrote an article chronicling the foreclosure sale of Blackacre. A group of law students in Indianapolis founded a brewery named Black Acre Brewing Co. in late 2010 as a homage to their legal schooling. Monica Youn's 2016 book of poetry from Graywolf Press is titled Blackacre, in reference to the legal concept (Youn has a law degree from Yale).

See also
 Dewey, Cheatem & Howe, another legal placeholder name

References

Real property law
Placeholder names